Home is the fourth studio album by American bluegrass musician Billy Strings, following Turmoil & Tinfoil and preceding Renewal. Released on September 27, 2019, the album stayed on the Billboard Bluegrass Albums chart for 77 weeks, peaking at number one and being the first studio album by Billy Strings to do so.  The album was titled Home simply for the fact that Strings was starting to "feel at home" in his Nashville residence and in the music industry at the time of the album's release.

The album earned Strings his first Grammy Award for Best Bluegrass Album at the 63rd Annual Grammy Awards in March 2021. His song "Taking Water", one of the tracks on the album, was performed on Jimmy Kimmel Live!.

Overview and meaning
American singer-songwriter Molly Tuttle gave background vocals on "Must Be Seven". The lead track on the album, "Taking Water", focuses on groups of people being "left behind in society", while "Away From The Mire" focuses on what Strings states was "personal stuff between me and a family member".

Reception
Home was positively received by reviewers and the public. Kenny Berkowitz of Acoustic Guitar stated "...the most startling thing about the album: the way Strings can channel the Grand Ole Opry one minute, fly his freak flag the next, and be perfectly at home in both." Michael Davis of No Depression said "The songwriting [of Home] is cutting and intelligent" as well as stating that "Home demonstrates that Strings is primed to keep exploring the outer reaches of roots music." Ron Harris of ABC News stated that "Songs like 'Hollow Heart' are beautifully delivered, but traditional bluegrass in approach and structure." Carol Thompson of the Lansing State Journal states the album "exemplifies Strings' talent and frenetic, creative energy".

Track listing

References

2019 albums
Billy Strings albums
Grammy Award for Best Bluegrass Album